is a village located in Uda District, Nara Prefecture, Japan.

As of October 2016, the village has an estimated population of 1,696 and a density of 21 persons per km². The total area is 79.63 km². The primary industry in the village was forestry, but the industry has suffered in recent years. The village is developing a new program to revitalize it by exporting model homes to Thailand, where similar wooden architecture has largely disappeared.

Geography
Mitsue is located in the southern portion of the Soni Plateau, and the upper part of the Nabari River is situated here. The entire village is mountainous, with many peaks.
 Mountains : Mount Miune (1235 m)

Surrounding municipalities
 Nara Prefecture
 Soni
 Higashiyoshino
 Mie Prefecture
 Tsu
 Matsusaka

Notable locations
 Maruyama Park
 Mitsue Plateau Ranch
 Mitsue Hot Springs
Mitsu also hosts an annual scarecrow festival.

References

External links

 Mitsue official website 

Villages in Nara Prefecture